The 2014–15 Eastern Michigan Eagles men's basketball team represented Eastern Michigan University during the 2014–15 NCAA Division I men's basketball season. The Eagles, led by fourth year head coach Rob Murphy, played their home games at the Eastern Michigan University Convocation Center, as members of the West Division of the Mid-American Conference. They finished the season 21–14, 8–10 in MAC play to finish in a tie for fourth place in the West Division. They advanced to the quarterfinals of the MAC tournament where they lost to Toledo. They were invited to the College Basketball Invitational where they lost in the first round to Louisiana–Monroe.

Roster additions
SF Brandon Nazione from Des Moines Area Community College to EMU where he was a Division II Second-Team All-American. 
Jerome Hunter from Alabama A&M 
 Anali Okoloji from George Mason.  
PF Jordan Nobles (Canton HS)
PG Ethan Alvano (Corona HS)
SG Tim Bond (Baltimore City College HS)
PF Tristan Wilson (Skyline HS). 
Matt Cline joined the EMU basketball staff as the Director of Men's Basketball Operations in 2014.

Two players transferred away from EMU after the 2013/14 season, Jalen Ross will be going to Hartford & Darrell Combs to IUPUI. Former EMU standout and NBA player Carl Thomas was hired by Jackson College as Head Coach of the men's basketball team.

Preseason accolades 
Senior forward Karrington Ward was named the 15th-best defensive player in the country according to BleacherReport.com.

Roster

Schedule

|-
!colspan=9 style="background:#006633; color:#FFFFFF;"| Regular season

|-
!colspan=9 style="background:#006633; color:#FFFFFF;"| MAC tournament

|-
!colspan=9 style="background:#006633; color:#FFFFFF;"| College Basketball Invitational

MAC Leaders 

INDIVIDUAL PLAYER GAME HIGHS
 Free throw percentage
 Mike Talley- 1.000 (9-9)(at Ball State (3/3/15)
 Raven Lee- 1.000(8-8) vs Bowling Green (3/11/15)
 Steals
 Raven Lee- 6 vs Coppin State (12/23/14)
 Mike Talley- 6 at Ball State (3/3/15)
 Blocked Shots
 Karrington Ward 6 vs Coppin State (12/23/14)
 Turnovers
 Raven Lee- 8 vs Akron (02/14/15)
Team Highs
 Margin
 58 (100-42) vs Concordia (12/28/14)
 Rebounds
 59 vs Marygrove (12/01/14)
 Steals
 17 vs Longwood (11/23/14)
 Blocked Shots
 10 vs Coppin State (12/23/14)
 10 vs Ball State (1/07/15)
Opponent Lows
 Points
 35 vs Rochester (11/26/14)
 Field Goals Made
 11 vs Rochester (11/26/14)
 13 vs Ohio (01/27/15)
 Field Goal Attempts
 39 at Northern Illinois (02/21/15)
 Field Goal Percentage
 .224 vs Rochester (11/26/14)
 .228 vs Ohio (01/27/15)
 Free Throws Made 
 1 vs Saint Francis (11/14/14)
 Free Throws Attempted
 2 vs Saint Francis (11/14/14)
 Fouls
 9  vs Ohio (01/27/15)
MAC Statistic Leaders
 Field Goal Pct Defense- .401
 Steals- 8.9
MAC Player of the Week
 Nov. 24, 2014 Raven Lee
 Feb. 16, 2015 Karrington Ward
 Mar. 07, 2015 Mike Talley
Academic All MAC
 Olalekan Ajayi
 Trent Perry
3rd Team All-MAC
 2015 Raven Lee
MAC Honorable Mention
 2015 Karrington Ward

References

Eastern Michigan Eagles men's basketball seasons
Eastern Michigan
Eastern Michigan
Eastern Michigan Eagles men's basketball
Eastern Michigan Eagles men's basketball